Mark Stephen DeJohn (born September 18, 1953) is an American professional baseball coach and former infielder and manager.

He was born in Middletown, Connecticut.

A former shortstop, DeJohn was chosen by the New York Mets in the 23rd round of the 1971 amateur draft after his graduation from Woodrow Wilson High School in Middletown. He spent seven years in the Mets farm system, including three with the Triple-A Tidewater Tides, before becoming a free agent before the  season.

He eventually signed with the Detroit Tigers, who gave him his only Major League trial at the outset of the  campaign. DeJohn appeared in 24 games, eight of them as starting shortstop.

He collected four hits in 21 at bats for a .190 average, including two doubles, one run, one RBI and one stolen base.

DeJohn began his coaching career in the Detroit minor league system and made his managerial debut in 1985 as one of four managers employed by Detroit's Double-A Birmingham Barons affiliate.

The following season, DeJohn joined the St. Louis Cardinals organization as a full-time minor league skipper. Apart from the 1992 season, when he returned to Detroit to manage the Double-A London Tigers of the Eastern League, DeJohn has been a member of the St. Louis organization since as a minor league manager (1986–91; 2002–09), field coordinator of instruction (1993–95), and coach on Tony LaRussa's Major League staff with the Cardinals during LaRussa's first six seasons as Redbird manager (1996–2001).

See also
 List of St. Louis Cardinals coaches

References

External links

1953 births
Living people
Baseball players from Connecticut
Batavia Trojans players
Birmingham Barons managers
Detroit Tigers players
Evansville Triplets players
Leones del Caracas players
American expatriate baseball players in Venezuela
Louisville Redbirds managers
Major League Baseball bench coaches
Major League Baseball bullpen coaches
Major League Baseball shortstops
Marion Mets players
Sportspeople from Middletown, Connecticut
Pompano Beach Mets players
St. Louis Cardinals coaches
Tidewater Tides players
Victoria Toros players